Maílson Alves Barreiro Veriato (born 5 February 1988) is a Brazilian professional footballer who plays as a defender.

Career

Brazil
Alves started his career in Portugal with Portimonense in the Segunda Liga. He made his debut for the club on 28 October 2009 in a Taça de Portugal against Beira-Mar. He started the match but got sent off in the 85th minute as the match ended in a 0–0 draw. He soon went back to Brazil where he joined Porto Alegre and played for them in the Campeonato Gaúcho. He made his debut for them on 16 January 2011 against Novo Hamburgo. He started the match and played 68 minutes as Porto Alegre lost 1–0. After two years with Porto Alegre, Mailson signed for Tombense but was loaned to Vila Nova of the Série D for the 2013 season. He made his debut for Nova on 28 July 2013 against Marcílio Dias. He started the match as Vila Nova drew it 0–0. He eventually returned to Tombense and made his debut for them on 1 February 2014 against América. Mailson moved clubs again in 2015 when he signed for Tupi. Mailson played for the club in both the Série C and Campeonato Mineiro.

Chennaiyin
After finishing his contract with Tupi, Mailson decided to go abroad again and signed for Indian Super League side, Chennaiyin.

On 17 March 2018, Alves scored two goals to help Chennaiyin defeat Bengaluru 2–3 in the 2017–18 Indian Super League finals, he was also named the man of the match. Under his captaincy Chennaiyin FC stood runner-ups of 2019 Indian Super Cup and Chennaiyin FC, for the first time reached the 2019 AFC Cup qualifying play-offs and finally the group stage of 2019 AFC Cup. He also scored a goal Manang Marshyangdi Club of Nepal on April 4 in the 53rd minute.

Abahani Limited Dhaka
Mailson joined Bangladesh Premier League side Dhaka Abahani in October 2019. He made his debut against Bangladesh Police FC in a Federation Cup match. On February 5, 2020, he scored first goal for the club against maldivian side Maziya in an AFC Cup qualifying play-off match & helped his team to get a 2–2 draw.

Career statistics

Honours

Club
Chennaiyin FC
 Indian Super League: 2015, 2017–18

References

1988 births
Living people
Brazilian footballers
Brazilian expatriate footballers
Portimonense S.C. players
Porto Alegre Futebol Clube players
Tombense Futebol Clube players
Vila Nova Futebol Clube players
Tupi Football Club players
Chennaiyin FC players
Association football defenders
Liga Portugal 2 players
Indian Super League players
Expatriate footballers in India